The 2020 season is the 123rd season of competitive football in Sweden. The men's team will participate in UEFA Euro 2020 as well as in the 2020–21 UEFA Nations League, and the women's team will be attempting to qualify for the UEFA Women's Euro 2021.

Domestic results

Men's football

2020 Allsvenskan

2021 Allsvenskan play-offs

Kalmar FF won 4–1 on aggregate.

2020 Superettan

2021 Superettan play-offs

Landskrona BoIS won 3–1 on aggregate.

2–2 on aggregate. Trelleborgs FF won 4–1 on penalties.

National teams

Sweden men's national football team

2020–21 UEFA Nations League

Group A3

Friendlies

Sweden women's national football team

UEFA Women's Euro 2021 qualifying

Group F

2020 Algarve Cup

References 

 
Seasons in Swedish football